Akhmed Khasanovich Parchiyev (born 10 July 1996) is a Russian football midfielder.

Club career
He made his debut in the Russian Second Division for FC Angusht Nazran on 16 July 2012 in a game against FC Taganrog. He made his Russian Football National League debut for Angusht on 16 March 2014 in a game against FC Torpedo Moscow.

References

External links
 Career summary by sportbox.ru

1996 births
Living people
Russian footballers
Association football midfielders
FC Angusht Nazran players